Gorgavan (also Romanized as Gorgāvān; also known as Gorgābān and Gorgāvand) is a village in Osmanvand Rural District, Firuzabad District, Kermanshah County, Kermanshah Province, Iran. At the 2006 census, its population was 84, in 19 families.

References 

Populated places in Kermanshah County